is a Japanese actress and singer. Her given name Mei originates from her birth month (May) in English. She has been frequently featured in many Japanese dramas and Kaidan Shin Mimibukuro: Yūrei Mansion films.

Filmography

Film
 (2005)
 (2006)
 (2008)
Boys on the Run (2010)
 Sweet Little Lies (2010)
Yakuza Weapon (2011)
Killers (2014)
Our Family (2014)
Riding the Breeze (2014) 南風 (電影)
Ninja Hunter (2015)
Nijūrokuya machi (2017)
21st Century Girl (2019)
Ito (2021)
To the Supreme! (2022), Nanase Kitagawa

Television
Carnation (2011, NHK)

References

External links
 Official profile 

Japanese film actresses
Japanese television actresses
People from Nishitōkyō, Tokyo
1987 births
Living people